Sharon L. Henderson (born December 3, 1958) is an American politician from Georgia. Henderson is a Democrat member of Georgia House of Representatives for District 113.

References

External links
 Biography at Ballotpedia

Living people
Democratic Party members of the Georgia House of Representatives
21st-century American politicians
21st-century American women politicians
African-American state legislators in Georgia (U.S. state)
African-American women in politics
People from Goose Creek, South Carolina
Women state legislators in Georgia (U.S. state)
21st-century African-American women
21st-century African-American politicians
1958 births